Juan Pablo Colinas Ferreras (born 2 September 1978), known as Juan Pablo, is a Spanish former professional footballer who played as a goalkeeper.

Club career
Born in León, Castile and León, Juan Pablo began his professional career with hometown club Cultural y Deportiva Leonesa, moving in 2000 to Deportivo Alavés. In his first season with the first team, he backedup Frenchman Richard Dutruel (formerly of FC Barcelona), but could never break into the starting eleven, only totalling 15 league appearances in three years, the last two being spent in the second division. His first La Liga match occurred on 22 September 2002, a 1–0 away win over Villarreal CF.

Subsequently, Juan Pablo moved to CD Numancia also in the second tier, being heavily featured over two seasons. After a shaky campaign at CD Tenerife– he began as a starter, but failed to appear in the final months – he returned to the Soria side, playing all the games but one in that year's top flight, in an eventual relegation.

Juan Pablo terminated his contract with Numancia in June 2009, and signed a three-year deal with Sporting de Gijón. He did not miss one single minute in his first season, as the Asturians retained their top-division status for another year (Iván Cuéllar, the previous starter, suffered another serious injury, this time in the knee).

On 10 July 2013, Juan Pablo agreed a one-year contract with Maccabi Tel Aviv F.C. from the Israeli Premier League. He made his debut with the club seven days later, in a match against Győri ETO FC in the qualifying rounds of the UEFA Champions League.

Juan Pablo returned to Numancia for a third spell on 12 January 2016. On 1 September, the 38-year-old announced his retirement from professional football. He returned to active shortly after, however, going on to spend one a half seasons with AEK Larnaca FC of the Cypriot First Division.

Managerial Career
On January 30 2023 Juan Pablo returned to Israel once again to become the new Goalkeeping Coach for Maccabi Tel Aviv F.C.

Honours
Maccabi Tel-Aviv
Israeli Premier League: 2013–14, 2014–15
Israel State Cup: 2014–15 
Toto Cup: 2014–15

AEK Larnaca
Cypriot Cup: 2017–18

References

External links

1978 births
Living people
Sportspeople from León, Spain
Spanish footballers
Footballers from Castile and León
Association football goalkeepers
La Liga players
Segunda División players
Segunda División B players
Cultural Leonesa footballers
Deportivo Alavés B players
Deportivo Alavés players
CD Numancia players
CD Tenerife players
Sporting de Gijón players
Israeli Premier League players
Maccabi Tel Aviv F.C. players
Cypriot First Division players
AEK Larnaca FC players
Spanish expatriate footballers
Expatriate footballers in Israel
Expatriate footballers in Cyprus
Spanish expatriate sportspeople in Israel
Spanish expatriate sportspeople in Cyprus